

History 
ECAPS AB is a Swedish spacecraft propulsion company, established in 2000 as a joint venture between the Swedish Space Corporation (SSC) and Volvo Aero with the goal of developing and commercializing in-space thruster technology using a low toxicity Ammonium dinitramide (ADN) based liquid monopropellant called LMP-103S. In 2006 ECAPS became a fully owned subsidiary of SSC. In June 2010 the PRISMA mission launched ECAPS' first flight 1N thrusters which were successfully operated until the decommissioning of PRISMA in 2015. In July 2017, SSC sold ECAPS to Bradford Engineering based in the Netherlands which re-branded the company as Bradford ECAPS.

Adoption in Industry 
ECAPS technology (thrusters + propellant) has successfully flown on the following missions:

Thruster Description 
The ECAPS thruster technology produces thrust by thermally and catalytically decomposing, igniting, combusting, and exhausting monopropellant LMP-103S fed into the thruster's reactor. LMP-103S is a 'green' high performance storable liquid propellant based on ammonium dinitramide (ADN) blended with fuel, stabilizer and solvent. The thruster is composed of:

Flow Control Valve (FCV) 
A series redundant, normally closed, solenoid valve with PTFE seat material.

Thrust Chamber Assembly (TCA)

Propellant transfer assembly 
Composed of the FCV interface including two (redundant seal) EPDM O-rings, the feed tube, the feed tube heat-sink, and the injector head.

Thermal Stand-off 
Structural member between the FCV and the main thruster elements, which serves as a heat barrier. It is sized to suppress severe heat soak back from the thruster to the FCV.

Thrust Chamber 
Houses the staged reactor, which houses the propellant catalyst. The thrust chamber upstream side is brazed to the injector head. The nozzle is an integrated part of the thrust chamber on the down-stream side and is conical with an exit-to-throat area ratio of 100:1. The thrust chamber is made of iridium lined rhenium to withstand the high temperature reaction products of propellant combustion and the resulting thermal cycling.

Reactor Heater 
Reactor heater is embedded in an Inconel tube with a ceramic insulator. The heater is a coiled tube which is integrated into heater carrier, which in turn is integrated via thermally conductive parts into the injector head.

Reactor Thermocouple 
Type K (chromel/alumel) and is embedded in an Inconel tube with a magnesium oxide insulator. The thermocouple is used for monitoring and controlling the pre-heating temperature.

LMP-103S Propellant Description 
Development of the storable liquid propellant blend LMP-103S began in 1997 between the Swedish Space Corporation and the Swedish Defense Research Agency. The top design priorities were to improve performance and reduce handling hazards as compared to hydrazine. Long term ground storage testing of the LMP-103S propellant in a flight-like system began in October 2005 and has demonstrated no measurable degradation or pressure build-up. Transport is approved as an UN/DOT1.4S article. Air transport on commercial flights of the LMP-103S propellant has been performed to the United States, the United Kingdom, Japan, Switzerland, Russia, India French Guiana, and within Sweden.

The propellant is 63.0% ADN, 14.0% water, 18.4% methanol and 4.6% ammonia by weight. LMP-103S has different properties than other traditional propellants such as hydrazine and nitrogen tetroxide. The latter are pure liquids, which (except for trace contaminants) can be completely evaporated, leaving no residues. In contrast, LMP-103S is a mixture comprising a high concentration of ADN "salt" dissolved in a mixture of solvents. Evaporation leads to a loss of solvents and thereby a changed composition of the solution (the ADN salt has no vapor pressure, so it only exists in solid or dissolved form). The solution does not have a distinct freezing point, but rather a temperature when the solution becomes saturated and solid ADN crystals will start to form in the liquid solvents (this is, however, a reversible phase separation).

References 
 http://www.ecaps.space/ Company homepage
On-Orbit Operation and Performance of Ammonium Dinitramide (ADN) Based High Performance Green Propulsion (HPGP) Systems JPC 2017 conference paper
Growing Constellation of Ammonium Dinitramide (ADN) Based High Performance Green Propulsion (HPGP) Systems JPC 2018 conference paper

Propulsion
Spacecraft attitude control
Monopropellant rocket engines